Vitaly Kushnarev (May 1, 1975, Mikhailov, Tatsinsky District) is a Russian political figure and deputy of the 8th State Duma.

From 1998 to 2003, Kushnarev was the chief specialist on restructuring the coal industry and, later, head of the investment Group at the administration of Belaya Kalitva. In 2004-2010, he headed the coal industry restructuring department, then the industry and construction department in the administration of the Belokalitvinsky District. He left the post to become the assistant to the governor of the Rostov Oblast Vasily Golubev. In 2014, he was appointed Minister of Transport of the Rostov Oblast. From 2016 to 2019, Kushnarev headed the administration of Rostov-on-Don. Since September 2021, he has served as deputy of the 8th State Duma.

References

1975 births
Living people
United Russia politicians
21st-century Russian politicians
Eighth convocation members of the State Duma (Russian Federation)